Targa is a village in the Punjab province of Pakistan. It is located in Kasur District at 31°10'0N 74°31'0E with an altitude of 193 metres (636 feet).

References

Populated places in Kasur District